The Cox Furniture Warehouse is a historic site in Gainesville, Florida, United States located at 602 South Main Street. On June 10, 1994, it was added to the U.S. National Register of Historic Places.

Gallery

References

External links
 Alachua County listings at National Register of Historic Places
 Alachua County listings at Florida's Office of Cultural and Historical Programs
 Virtual tour of Downtown Gainesville and Related Structures at Alachua County's Department of Growth Management

Buildings and structures in Gainesville, Florida
National Register of Historic Places in Gainesville, Florida
Warehouses on the National Register of Historic Places
1914 establishments in Florida
Industrial buildings completed in 1914